Eot is an island and municipality in the state of Chuuk, Federated States of Micronesia. It is Northeast of Udot, another Micronesian island.

References

 Statoids.com, retrieved December 8, 2010

Municipalities of Chuuk State
Islands of Chuuk State